K. Lalremruata (born 9 March 1987) is an Indian cricketer. He made his first-class debut for Mizoram in the 2018–19 Ranji Trophy on 20 December 2018. He made his Twenty20 debut for Mizoram in the 2018–19 Syed Mushtaq Ali Trophy on 21 February 2019.

References

External links
 

1987 births
Living people
Indian cricketers
Mizoram cricketers
Place of birth missing (living people)